The Lucens reactor was a 6 MW experimental nuclear power reactor built next to Lucens, Vaud, Switzerland. After its connection to the electrical grid on 29 January 1968, the reactor only operated for a few months before it suffered an accident on 21 January 1969. The cause was a corrosion-induced loss of heat dispersal leading to the destruction of a pressure tube which caused an adjacent pressure tube to fail, and partial meltdown of the core, resulting in radioactive contamination of the cavern.

Description 
In 1962 the construction of a Swiss-designed pilot nuclear power plant began. The heavy-water moderated, carbon dioxide gas-cooled reactor was built in a cavern. It produced 28 MW of heat, which was used to generate 6 MW of electricity, and it became critical 29 December 1966. It was fueled by 0.96% enriched uranium alloyed with chromium cased in magnesium alloy (magnesium with 0.6% zirconium) inserted into a graphite matrix. Carbon dioxide gas was pumped into the top of the channels at 6.28 MPa and 223 °C and exited the channels at a pressure of 5.79 MPa and at a temperature of 378 °C.

Nuclear accident 

It was intended to operate until the end of 1969, but during a startup on 21 January 1969, it suffered a loss-of-coolant accident, leading to a partial core meltdown and the radioactive contamination of the cavern, which was then sealed. Using the criteria of the International Nuclear Event Scale, introduced in 1990 by the International Atomic Energy Agency, the event has been assessed as a Level 4 "Accident with local consequences".

The accident was caused by water condensation forming on some magnesium alloy fuel element components during shutdown and corroding them. These corrosion products accumulated in some fuel channels. One of the vertical fuel channels was sufficiently blocked by it to impede the flow of carbon dioxide coolant, causing the magnesium alloy cladding to melt and further block the channel. The increase in temperature and exposure of the uranium metal fuel to the coolant eventually caused the fuel to catch fire in the carbon dioxide coolant atmosphere. The pressure tube surrounding the fuel channel split because of overheating and bowing of the burning fuel assembly, and the carbon dioxide coolant leaked out of the reactor.

No irradiation of workers or the population occurred, though the reactor's cavern was seriously contaminated. The cavern was decontaminated, and the reactor was dismantled over the next few years. The plant was decommissioned in 1988, and the last radioactive waste was removed in 2003.

See also 

 Nuclear power in Switzerland
 List of civilian nuclear accidents

References

External links 

 Maps of Nuclear Power Reactors: Switzerland
 Major Nuclear Power Plant Accidents 

Buildings and structures in the canton of Vaud
Former nuclear research institutes
Nuclear accidents and incidents
Radioactively contaminated areas
1962 establishments in Switzerland
1969 disestablishments in Switzerland
Former nuclear power stations in Switzerland